"Summerfling" is a song by Canadian singer-songwriter k.d. lang. It was released in 2000 as the first single from her fifth solo album, Invincible Summer (2000). It peaked at number 83 on the UK Singles Chart and number 16 on the US Billboard Maxi-Singles Sales chart. The music video for the song was directed by Liz Friedlander.

Critical reception

Jose F. Promis of AllMusic gave the single 4 out of 5 stars, writing: "This is the type of seminal recording that, since it was never a hit upon initial release, deserves to be rediscovered by a music supervisor and used in a film -- it's that good, and it's a true shame that something as timeless and lovely as this ditty can't muster enough muscle to dent the U.S. pop charts." Jay Lustig of NJ.com called it "a quintessential summertime song -- warm, relaxed and effortlessly catchy."

Track listings
 US maxi-CD single
 "Summerfling" (Victor Calderone extended vocal remix) – 8:57
 "Summerfling" (Wamdue's Summer Bliss extended mix) – 6:27
 "Summerfling" (Ananda's Sweet Bird of Summer extended mix) – 8:40
 "Summerfling" (Victor Calderone dub version) – 5:59
 "Summerfling" (Wamdue's Makin' Me High dub) – 5:25
 "Summerfling" (Ananda's Sweet Dub of Summer) – 7:18
 "Summerfling" (album version) – 4:16

 US 12-inch vinyl single
A1. "Summerfling" (Victor Calderone extended vocal remix) – 8:57
A2. "Summerfling" (Victor Calderone dub version) – 5:59
B1. "Summerfling" (Wamdue's Summer Bliss extended mix) – 6:27
B2. "Summerfling" (Wamdue's Makin' Me High dub) – 5:25

 UK CD single
 "Summerfling" (radio edit) – 3:52
 "Summerfling" (Propellerheads mix) – 3:48
 "Constant Craving" (live in Sydney) – 5:45

 Australian maxi-CD single
 "Summerfling" (radio edit) – 3:52
 "Summerfling" (Calderone radio mix) – 4:10
 "Summerfling" (Propellerheads mix) – 3:49
 "Constant Craving" (live in Sydney) – 5:37
 "Summerfling" (extended vocal mix) – 8:57

Charts

Release history

References

Further reading

External links
 
 

2000 singles
2000 songs
K.d. lang songs
Songs written by k.d. lang
Warner Records singles